The 46th Academy Awards were presented on Tuesday, April 2, 1974, at the Dorothy Chandler Pavilion in Los Angeles, California. The ceremonies were presided over by Burt Reynolds, Diana Ross, John Huston, and David Niven.

The Sting won 7 awards, including Best Picture and Best Director for George Roy Hill. The Exorcist and The Way We Were were the only other films to win multiple awards. Marvin Hamlisch won 3 awards, the third person to achieve this feat and, to date, the only person who has won 3 Oscars in one year without winning Best Picture.

Winners and nominees

Nominations announced on February 19, 1974. Winners are listed first, highlighted in boldface and indicated with a double dagger.
{| class=wikitable
|-
! style="background:#EEDD82; width:50%" | Best Picture
! style="background:#EEDD82; width:50%" | Best Director
|-
| valign="top" |
 The Sting – Tony Bill, Julia Phillips and Michael Phillips, producers
American Graffiti – Francis Ford Coppola, producer; Gary Kurtz, co-producer
Cries and Whispers – Ingmar Bergman, producer
The Exorcist – William Peter Blatty, producer
A Touch of Class – Melvin Frank, producer
| valign="top" |
George Roy Hill – The Sting
George Lucas – American Graffiti
Ingmar Bergman – Cries and Whispers
William Friedkin – The Exorcist
Bernardo Bertolucci – Last Tango in Paris
|-
! style="background:#EEDD82" | Best Actor
! style="background:#EEDD82" | Best Actress
|-
| valign="top" |
Jack Lemmon – Save the Tiger as Harry Stoner
Marlon Brando – Last Tango in Paris as Paul
Jack Nicholson – The Last Detail as Billy "Badass" Buddusky
Al Pacino – Serpico as Frank Serpico
Robert Redford – The Sting as Johnny Hooker
| valign="top" |
Glenda Jackson – A Touch of Class as Vicki Allessio
Ellen Burstyn – The Exorcist as Chris MacNeil
Marsha Mason – Cinderella Liberty as Maggie Paul
Barbra Streisand – The Way We Were as Katie Morosky
Joanne Woodward – Summer Wishes, Winter Dreams as Rita Pritchett-Walden
|-
! style="background:#EEDD82" | Best Supporting Actor
! style="background:#EEDD82" | Best Supporting Actress
|-
| valign="top" |
John Houseman – The Paper Chase as Professor Charles W. Kingsfield Jr.
Vincent Gardenia – Bang the Drum Slowly as Dutch
Jack Gilford – Save the Tiger as Phil
Jason Miller – The Exorcist as Damien Karras
Randy Quaid – The Last Detail as Larry Meadows
| valign="top" |
Tatum O'Neal – Paper Moon as Addie Loggins
Linda Blair – The Exorcist as Regan MacNeil
Candy Clark – American Graffiti as Debbie Dunham
Madeline Kahn – Paper Moon as Trixie Delight
Sylvia Sidney – Summer Wishes, Winter Dreams as Mrs. Pritchett
|-
! style="background:#EEDD82" | Best Story and Screenplay Based on Factual Material or Material Not Previously Produced or Published
! style="background:#EEDD82" | Best Screenplay Based on Material from Another Medium
|-
| valign="top" |
The Sting – David S. WardAmerican Graffiti – George Lucas, Gloria Katz and Willard Huyck
Cries and Whispers – Ingmar Bergman
Save the Tiger – Steve Shagan
A Touch of Class – Melvin Frank and Jack Rose
| valign="top" |The Exorcist – 'William Peter Blatty based on his novel 
The Last Detail – Robert Towne based on the novel by Darryl Ponicsan
The Paper Chase – James Bridges based on the novel by John Jay Osborn Jr.
Paper Moon – Alvin Sargent based on the novel Addie Pray by Joe David Brown
Serpico – Waldo Salt and Norman Wexler based on the book by Peter Maas
|-
! style="background:#EEDD82" | Best Foreign Language Film
! style="background:#EEDD82" | Best Documentary Feature
|-
| valign="top" |Day for Night – FranceThe House on Chelouche Street – Israel
L'Invitation – Switzerland
The Pedestrian – Germany (West)
Turkish Delight – Netherlands
| valign="top" | The Great American Cowboy – Kieth MerrillAlways a New Beginning – John D. Goodell
Battle of Berlin (Schlacht um Berlin) – Franz Baake and Jost von Morr
Journey to the Outer Limits – Alexander Grasshoff
Walls of Fire – Herbert Kline and Edmund Penney
|-
! style="background:#EEDD82" | Best Documentary Short Subject
! style="background:#EEDD82" | Best Live Action Short Subject
|-
| valign="top" | Princeton: A Search for Answers – Julian Krainin and DeWitt L. Sage Jr.Background
Christo's Valley Curtain
Four Stones for Kanemitsu
Paisti ag obair
| valign="top" | The Bolero – Allan Miller and William FertikClockmaker – Richard Gayer
Life Times Nine – Pen Densham and John Watson
|-
! style="background:#EEDD82" | Best Animated Short Subject
! style="background:#EEDD82" | Best Original Dramatic Score
|-
| valign="top" |Frank Film – Frank MourisThe Legend of John Henry – Nick Bosustow and David Adams
Pulcinella – Emanuele Luzzati and Guilo Gianini
| valign="top" |The Way We Were – Marvin Hamlisch Cinderella Liberty – John Williams
 The Day of the Dolphin – Georges Delerue
 Papillon – Jerry Goldsmith
 A Touch of Class – John Cameron
|-
! style="background:#EEDD82" | Best Scoring: Original Song Score and Adaptation or Scoring: Adaptation
! style="background:#EEDD82" | Best Song
|-
| valign="top" |The Sting – Adapted by Marvin Hamlisch Jesus Christ Superstar – Adapted by André Previn, Herbert W. Spencer and Andrew Lloyd Webber
 Tom Sawyer – Song Score by Richard M. Sherman and Robert B. Sherman; Adapted by John Williams
| valign="top" |"The Way We Were" — The Way We Were • Music by Marvin Hamlisch • Lyrics by Alan and Marilyn Bergman "All That Love Went to Waste" — A Touch of Class • Music by George Barrie • Lyrics by Sammy Cahn
 "Live and Let Die" — Live and Let Die • Music and Lyrics by Paul McCartney and Linda McCartney
 "Love" — Robin Hood • Music by George Bruns • Lyrics by Floyd Huddleston
 "(You're So) Nice to Be Around" — Cinderella Liberty • Music by John Williams • Lyrics by Paul Williams
|-
! style="background:#EEDD82" | Best Costume Design
! style="background:#EEDD82" | Best Sound
|-
| valign="top" |The Sting – Edith HeadCries and Whispers – Marik Vos
Ludwig – Piero Tosi
Tom Sawyer – Donfeld
The Way We Were – Dorothy Jeakins and Moss Mabry
| valign="top" |The Exorcist – Robert Knudson and Chris NewmanThe Day of the Dolphin – Richard Portman and Larry Jost
The Paper Chase – Donald O. Mitchell and Larry Jost
Paper Moon – Richard Portman and Les Fresholtz
The Sting – Ronald Pierce and Robert R. Bertrand
|-
! style="background:#EEDD82" | Best Art Direction
! style="background:#EEDD82" | Best Cinematography
|-
| valign="top" | The Sting – Art Direction: Henry Bumstead; Set Decoration: James W. PayneBrother Sun, Sister Moon – Art Direction: Lorenzo Mongiardino and Gianni Quaranta; Set Decoration: Carmelo Patrono
The Exorcist – Art Direction: Bill Malley; Set Decoration: Jerry Wunderlich
Tom Sawyer – Art Direction: Philip Jefferies; Set Decoration: Robert De Vestel
The Way We Were – Art Direction: Stephen B. Grimes; Set Decoration: William Kiernan (posthumous nomination)
| valign="top" | Cries and Whispers – Sven NykvistThe Exorcist – Owen Roizman
Jonathan Livingston Seagull – Jack Couffer
The Sting – Robert Surtees
The Way We Were – Harry Stradling Jr.
|-
! style="background:#EEDD82" | Best Film Editing
|-
| valign="top" |The Sting — William H. Reynolds' American Graffiti — Verna Fields and Marcia Lucas
 The Day of the Jackal — Ralph Kemplen
 The Exorcist – Jordan Leondopoulos, Bud S. Smith, Evan A. Lottman and Norman Gay
 Jonathan Livingston Seagull — Frank P. Keller and James Galloway
|}

Streaking incident
The 46th Academy Awards ceremony is perhaps best remembered as the ceremony in which a streaker named Robert Opel ran across the stage naked while flashing a peace sign with his hand. In response, host David Niven jokingly quipped, "Isn't it fascinating to think that probably the only laugh that man will ever get in his life is by stripping off and showing his shortcomings?"

Other notable events

 First-time nominee George Lucas made his debut at the Academy Awards with his nostalgic teen drama American Graffiti. It was nominated for Best Picture (Francis Ford Coppola and Gary Kurtz), Director & Story and Screenplay Based on Factual Material or Material Not Previously Produced or Published (Lucas), Editor (Marcia Lucas) and Candy Clark for Best Supporting Actress.
 Katharine Hepburn made her first and only appearance at the ceremony to present The Irving G. Thalberg Memorial Award to her longtime friend Lawrence Weingarten. Whenever she won an Oscar, she always had either the presenter or another person associated with her film accept it on her behalf. Upon taking the stage, she received a standing ovation, to which she replied "I'm living proof that a person can wait forty-one years to be unselfish." Coincidentally, Debbie Reynolds, Elizabeth Taylor and Connie Stevens, who were all ex-wives of Eddie Fisher's, each appeared in some form.
 This was Susan Hayward's last public appearance before she died of brain cancer in 1975.
 At 10 years, 148 days of age, Tatum O'Neal won Best Supporting Actress for her role in Paper Moon. She became the youngest winner of an Oscar, a feat unmatched to this day.
 During the ceremony, the whole in memoriam tribute was for legendary producer Samuel Goldwyn, who had died at age 94, three months prior to the event. He is the only person to have an Academy Awards ceremony dedicated solely to him.
 Longtime film veteran/comedian Groucho Marx was presented with an Honorary Academy Award for his contributions to the cinema.
 Julia Phillips of The Sting became the first female producer to win for Best Picture.
 With Tatum O'Neal being 10 years old and John Houseman being 71 years old, this was the biggest age gap ever for 2 acting wins.

Multiple nominations and awards

These films had multiple nominations:10 nominations:  The Exorcist and The Sting6 nominations: The Way We Were5 nominations: American Graffiti, Cries and Whispers and A Touch of Class4 nominations: Paper Moon3 nominations: Cinderella Liberty, The Last Detail, The Paper Chase, Save the Tiger and Tom Sawyer2 nominations: The Day of the Dolphin, Jonathan Livingston Seagull, Last Tango in Paris, Serpico and Summer Wishes, Winter DreamsThe following films received multiple awards.7 wins: The Sting2 wins: The Exorcist and The Way We Were''

Presenters and performers
The following individuals, listed in order of appearance, presented awards or performed musical numbers.

Presenters

Performers

See also
 31st Golden Globe Awards
 1973 in film
 16th Grammy Awards
 25th Primetime Emmy Awards
 26th Primetime Emmy Awards
 27th British Academy Film Awards
 28th Tony Awards

References

External links
 The Life of Oscar Streaker, Robert Opel @WFMU

Academy Awards ceremonies
1973 film awards
1974 in Los Angeles
1974 in American cinema
April 1974 events in the United States
Television shows directed by Marty Pasetta